Żerków-Czeszewo Landscape Park (Żerkowsko-Czeszewski Park Krajobrazowy) is a protected area (Landscape Park) in west-central Poland.

The Park lies within Greater Poland Voivodeship. The area of the park is 15,794.84 ha.

Cultural values 
On the territory of Zerkowsko-Czeszewo Landscape Park there is a palace in Smielow from the end of the 18th century, where Adam Mickiewicz stayed in the summer of 1831 and where there is a museum named after him, established in 1975. One of the most valuable monuments is also the built 15th-century Gothic church in the village of Debno. On the northern edge of the Park is the 19th-century neo-Renaissance Mielżyński Palace in Miloslaw with its extensive preserved parkland.

References 

Landscape parks in Poland
Parks in Greater Poland Voivodeship